The Romanian landings in Bulgaria were a decisive military action during the Second Balkan War. In as much as Bulgaria was fighting both Greece and Serbia at the time, the Romanian invasion made the situation untenable for the Bulgarians, who were forced to ask for peace two weeks later.

Background

Bulgarian dissatisfaction with its share of the spoils in the aftermath of the First Balkan War led to the souring of relations between Bulgaria and its former allies, Serbia and Greece.

In a diplomatic circular that said, "Romania does not intend either to subjugate the polity nor defeat the army of Bulgaria", the Romanian government endeavoured to allay international concerns about its motives and increased bloodshed.

Romanian invasion
The Romanian warships which carried out the landings were concentrated at Corabia, on the Romanian side of the Danube, under the command of Admiral Eustațiu Sebastian. This group consisted of three monitors, six torpedo boats, and the gunboat Grivița. A second landing was carried out on the following day, and a pontoon bridge was also built. Foreign military strategists considered the bridge a "masterpiece of warfare", as the  structure was finished in 26 hours, requiring 125 pontoons.

There were also four motorboats. Faced with the overwhelming superiority of the Romanian warships, the Bulgarians scuttled their four gunboats.

Aftermath
The Romanian troops landed at Oryahovo, Gigen and Nikopol.

The lack of resistance to the Romanian invasion convinced the Ottomans to invade territories just ceded to Bulgaria after the First Balkan War, with the main objective being to reclaim Edirne (Adrianople). The Ottomans advanced rapidly, against virtually no Bulgarian resistance.

Citations

References
  
 
 

Bulgaria
Naval battles involving Bulgaria
Battles of the Second Balkan War